The Death of Virgil is a 1945 novel by the Austrian author Hermann Broch. The narrative reenacts the last hours of life of the Roman poet Virgil, in the port of Brundisium (Brindisi), whence he had accompanied the emperor Augustus,  his decision – frustrated by the emperor – to burn his Aeneid, and his final reconciliation with his destiny. Virgil's  heightened perceptions as he dies recall his life and the age in which he lives. The poet is in the interval between life and death, just as his culture hangs between the pagan and Christian eras. As he reflects, Virgil recognises that history is at a cusp and that he may have falsified reality in his attempt to create beauty.

Writing process
Broch started to write the novel in 1936, worked on a second version in 1938 – to some extent while imprisoned in Bad Aussee for three weeks – and finished it in the United States (1940-1945). The stream of consciousness and complex literary allusions in the novel were influenced by the modernist style of James Joyce. The first edition was an English translation by Jean Starr Untermeyer, who is said to have collaborated so closely with Broch as to be almost a co-author.

Publication
Pantheon Books of New York City published the book simultaneously in its original German as well as its English translation by Jean Starr Untermeyer in June 1945. George F. Peters claims that Broch had continued to work on the text after the English translation went to press in December 1944, resulting in some slight differences. A German language edition was also published in Zürich by Rhein Verlag in 1947, but the first publication in Germany was not until 1958 when editions were published in Frankfurt and Munich; the latter with colour illustrations by Celestino Piatti.  the most recent English language edition of the novel (Penguin, 2000) is out of print, although Vintage Books appears still to offer it in a 1995 reprint, and released it as an ebook on January 12, 2012.

Reception and influence
Erich Heller observed that if "The Death of Virgil is his masterpiece... it is a very problematical one, for it attempts to give literary shape to the author's growing aversion to literature. In the very year the novel appeared, Broch confessed to 'a deep revulsion' from literature as such – 'the domain of vanity and mendacity'. Written with a paradoxical, lyrical exuberance, it is the imaginary record of the poet's last day and his renunciation of poetry. He commands the manuscript of the Aeneid to be destroyed, not because it is incomplete or imperfect but because it is poetry and not 'knowledge'.  He even says his Georgics are useless, inferior to any expert treatise on agriculture. His friend the Emperor Augustus undoes his design and his works are saved."

Harry Levin comments that "Broch's novel creates out of a dying poet a rich, profound vision both of civilization and of primal concerns of all mankind."

The French composer Jean Barraqué composed a number of works inspired by The Death of Virgil.

Interpretation 
Some scholars have interpreted the book as an anti-Nazi novel. Virgil's fear that his writing will only serve to encourage autocratic repression is seen as a direct result of the Nazi Party's interest in and inspiration from classical sources.

Editions
 Broch, Hermann. Untermeyer, Jean Starr (tr.) The Death of Virgil (New York: Pantheon, 1945)
Broch, Hermann. Der Tod des Vergil (New York: Pantheon, 1945)
Broch, Hermann. Untermeyer, Jean Starr (tr.) The Death of Virgil (London: Routledge, 1946)
 Broch, Hermann. Der Tod des Vergil (Zürich: Rhein, 1947)
 Broch, Hermann. Der Tod des Vergil (Frankfurt: Suhrkamp, 1958)
 Broch, Hermann. Piatti, Celestino. Der Tod des Vergil (Munich: Deutscher Taschenbuch, 1958)
 Broch, Hermann. Untermeyer, Jean Starr (tr.) The Death of Virgil (London/New York: Penguin, 2000)

References

Further reading
Erich Heller, ‘Hitler in a very Small Town’, New York Times, January 25, 1987.
'Broch, Hermann', The Columbia Electronic Encyclopedia, 6th ed. (Columbia University, 2005). Retrieved July 28, 2005.
Levin, Bernard. Introduction to Broch, Hermann. Untermeyer, Jean Starr (tr.) The Death of Virgil (Oxford: University, 1983) 

1945 novels
Austrian novels
Novels by Hermann Broch
Novels set in ancient Rome
Cultural depictions of Virgil
Novels about writers
Novels about philosophers
Pantheon Books books
Austrian historical novels
Novels set in the 1st century BC